Phacelia ciliata is a species of phacelia known by the common name Great Valley phacelia. It is native to California, where it can be found in many of the coastal mountain ranges, the Central Valley, and the Sierra Nevada foothills; its distribution extends into Baja California. It grows in grasslands and low mountain slopes.

Description
Phacelia ciliata is an annual herb growing erect to a maximum height near half a meter. The branching or unbranched stem is glandular and lightly hairy. The oblong or oval leaves are up to 15 centimeters long, the larger ones divided into lobed or toothed leaflets.

The inflorescence is a one-sided curving or coiling cyme of many flowers. Each funnel- or bell-shaped flower has deeply veined, hair-lined sepals and a blue corolla with a pale throat.

External links
Jepson Manual Treatment — Phacelia ciliata
Phacelia ciliata Photo gallery

ciliata
Flora of California
Flora of Baja California
Flora of the Sierra Nevada (United States)
Natural history of the California chaparral and woodlands
Natural history of the California Coast Ranges
Natural history of the Central Valley (California)
Natural history of the Peninsular Ranges
Natural history of the San Francisco Bay Area
Natural history of the Santa Monica Mountains
Natural history of the Transverse Ranges
Flora without expected TNC conservation status